WLUR is a Public Radio and Variety formatted broadcast radio station licensed to and serving Lexington, Virginia.  WLUR is owned and operated by Washington and Lee University.

Programming
WLUR broadcasts student created programming from its studios in Lexington. WLUR retransmits programming from Radio IQ in the late night and early morning hours, and also airs Radio IQ when W&L is not in session. Its frequency is 91.5 FM.

WLUR previously was operated for most of its history by the school's Department of Journalism & Communications and was located on the third floor of Reid Hall, which houses the department. However, the department gave up control of the station in the 2000s, and it has been a student organization since. It broadcasts out of the Elrod Student Commons.

Doug Harwood

Since the early 70s, Saturday nights on WLUR have been turned over to an alumnus, Doug Harwood. His show, which features four hours of eclectic music and no talking, has run continuously since Harwood was a student at the school. As of Winter 2020, the show still aired weekly. Much of the music is played off vinyl from Harwood's extensive collection. The formal name of his show is the Anti-Headache Machine.

References

External links
 91-5 WLUR Online
 

NPR member stations
LUR
Washington and Lee University
LUR
Public radio stations in the United States
Radio stations established in 1967